Alan Conn is an Australian Paralympian archer and table tennis player from New South Wales. He had an accident at 18 on his motorcycle that led to him becoming paraplegic.  At the 1968 Tel Aviv Games, he won a gold medal in the Men's Columbia Round open archery event, with a world record score of 618, and a silver medal in the Mixed Pairs open dartchery event. He also competed but did not win a medal in the Men's Doubles B table tennis event. At the time of the Games, he was 24 years old, and working as a shoe maker for the Commonwealth rehabilitation artificial limb plant. He started competing in archery three years before the Games. At the 1972 Heidelberg Games, he won a bronze medal in the Men's FITA Round Team open.

References

Paralympic archers of Australia
Paralympic dartchers of Australia
Paralympic table tennis players of Australia
Archers at the 1968 Summer Paralympics
Dartchers at the 1968 Summer Paralympics
Table tennis players at the 1968 Summer Paralympics
Archers at the 1972 Summer Paralympics
Paralympic gold medalists for Australia
Paralympic silver medalists for Australia
Paralympic bronze medalists for Australia
Wheelchair category Paralympic competitors
Living people
Medalists at the 1968 Summer Paralympics
Medalists at the 1972 Summer Paralympics
Australian male archers
Year of birth missing (living people)
Paralympic medalists in archery
Paralympic medalists in dartchery